Turkey Island may refer to:

Turkey Island (James River), an island in the James River in the United States
Turkey Island (Maryland), an island in the Potomac River in the United States
Turkey Island (Ontario), an island in the Detroit River in Canada
Turkey Island, West Sussex, a place in West Sussex in England
Turkey Island, Hampshire, a place in Hampshire in England
Turkey Island, Australia, an island between mainland Australia and Fraser Island. 25°30'08.4"S 152°55'38.7"E.